The High Commission of Malaysia in New Delhi'' is the diplomatic mission of Malaysia in India. Dato Hidayat Abdul Hamid is current High Commissioner.

History
Official diplomatic relations between India and Malaysia was established in 1957, following the Federation of Malaya independence.

High Commissioners to India

See also

 Foreign relations of India
 Foreign relations of Malaysia
 India–Malaysia relations
 List of diplomatic missions in India
 List of diplomatic missions of Malaysia

Notes

References

External links
 Official website

Diplomatic missions in India
Diplomatic missions of Malaysia
India–Malaysia relations
Diplomatic missions in New Delhi